Mkhambathi Nature Reserve (or Mkambati Nature Reserve) is a protected area at Lusikisiki in the Eastern Cape, South Africa. The reserve is located in the Pondoland Centre of Plant Endemism and the greater Maputaland–Pondoland–Albany Hotspot, and is covered in open grassland, dotted with patches of indigenous forest, swamp forests and flanked by the forested ravines of the Msikaba and Mtentu rivers.

Biodiversity

Amphibians 
Amphibians occur in the coastal region of the reserve.

 Bush squeaker
 Forest tree frog
 Knysna leaf-folding frog
 Natal chirping frog
 Plaintive rain frog
 Yellow-striped reed frog

Birds 
The reserve has a large colony (400–800 individuals) of Cape vulture (a threatened species).

 African finfoot
 African grass owl
 Black-bellied bustard
 Black-bellied starling
 Black-rumped buttonquail
 Black-winged lapwing
 Broad-tailed warbler
 Brown scrub robin
 Buff-streaked chat
 Cape cormorant
 Cape vulture
 Chorister robin-chat
 Corn crake
 Crowned eagle
 Denham's bustard
 Grey crowned crane
 Grey sunbird
 Gurney's sugarbird
 Half-collared kingfisher
 Knysna woodpecker
 Olive sunbird
 Southern ground hornbill
 Spotted ground thrush
 Striped flufftail
 Swamp nightjar
 White-backed night heron

Mammals 

 Chacma baboon
 Black-backed jackal
 Bushbuck
 Eland
 Southern reedbuck
 Common duiker
 Zulu golden mole
 Forest shrew
 Least dwarf shrew

Reptiles 

 Natal black snake

 Southern brown egg eater
 Variable legless skink

Vegetation 
There is an abundance of endemic plants found in the Pondoland landscape of the reserve, including the endemic false water-berry, Rhynchocalyx lawsonioides. The Pondo palm is only found in this region, growing along the banks of the Msikaba and Mtentu rivers. Gurney's sugarbird can be found in protea bushes. Broad-tailed warblers can be found in marshland.

Threats 
The endemic plants in the reserve face threats from fire as a consequence of poaching game, and of pervading invasive alien plants like:

 Black wattle
 Guava
 Tickberry
 Triffid weed

Gallery

References 

Nature reserves in South Africa
Protected areas of the Eastern Cape
2009 establishments in South Africa
Protected areas established in 2009